= Ojamajo Adventure: Naisho no Mahō =

- Developer: Amada Printing
- Platform: Microsoft Windows
- Release: November 19, 2004
- Genre: Visual novel

Ojamajo Adventure: Naisho no Mahō (Japanese: おジャ魔女あどべんちゃ〜ないしょのまほう, Hepburn: Ojamajo Adobencha: Naisho no Mahō) is a visual novel developed by Amada Printing for Microsoft Windows, based on the Ojamajo Doremi series. After its initial release, it became highly sought after and can be very expensive to buy.

This is one of the only video games in the series that was a visual novel, rather than a children's learning game. It stars a new character who meets the Ojamajo and learns about being a witch and about friendship. By witnessing certain events with characters, their friendship levels will increase, and these events occur due to the player's choices.

== Plot ==
The story introduces Majorythm (マジョリズム, Majorizumu), a young witch who came to the human world to study them and learn how they live on a regular basis, meeting Doremi Harukaze and her friends, who are a fundamental part of the plot.
